Man's Size is a 1923 American silent drama film directed by Howard M. Mitchell and starring William Russell, Alma Bennett, and Stanton Heck. It is based upon the novel Man Size by William MacLeod Raine.

Plot
As described in a film magazine, Tom Morse (Russell), while in the Northwest on business for his uncle, meets Jessie McRae, a young woman of the wilderness, who destroys the barrels of whiskey that were being smuggled to the Indians. He at first mistakes her for a boy, owing to the clothing she was wearing, and carries her to her father to be punished and only then discovers his error. She tells him that her adopted father says her parents her murdered by some drunken Indians and that she therefore seeks to prevent any other catastrophe of the kind. Angus McRae (French) learns that Tom is the nephew of Carl Morse (Gordon) and forbids him from seeing Jessie again. Then Tom is put in charge of the trading post and, after he receives a commission from the government to assist in stamping out the traffic in liquor, he wins her friendship. Angus sells her to Bully West (Heck) to get rid of her. Tom's uncle Carl comes to visit him and meets Angus. They learn that Jessie has been sold and Tom rushes to her rescue while Carl tells Angus that he sold his own child. Jessie is saved from the villain and she and Tom receive the blessings of the two old men.

Cast
 William Russell as Tom Morse 
 Alma Bennett as Jessie McRae 
 Stanton Heck as Bully West 
 Charles K. French as Angus McRae 
 James Gordon as Carl Morse 
 Carl Stockdale as Whaley

References

Bibliography
 Solomon, Aubrey. The Fox Film Corporation, 1915-1935: A History and Filmography. McFarland, 2011.

External links

1923 films
1923 drama films
Silent American drama films
Films based on American novels
Films directed by Howard M. Mitchell
American silent feature films
1920s English-language films
American black-and-white films
Fox Film films
Films with screenplays by Joseph F. Poland
1920s American films